The 1926–27 season was the 18th in the history of the Isthmian League, an English football competition.

St Albans City were champions, winning their second Isthmian League title.

League table

References

Isthmian League seasons
I